North Carolina's 30th House district is one of 120 districts in the North Carolina House of Representatives. It has been represented by Democrat Marcia Morey since 2017.

Geography
Since 2003, the district has included part of Durham County. The district overlaps with the 22nd Senate district.

District officeholders since 1989

Election results

2022

2020

2018

2016

2014

2012

2010

2008

2006

2004

2002

2000

References

North Carolina House districts
Durham County, North Carolina